The British New Guinea Development Company was a company registered in London, England on 11 February 1910. It was formed to acquire and profit from lands, rights, and options in British New Guinea and surrounding islands. The company went into voluntary liquidation to form a new company in 1922.

References

External links
 

History of Papua New Guinea
Real estate companies established in 1910
British companies disestablished in 1922
British companies established in 1910
1910 establishments in England
1922 disestablishments in England
Trading companies disestablished in the 20th century
Trading companies established in the 20th century
Trading companies of the United Kingdom